Quincy Municipal Airport may refer to:

 Quincy Municipal Airport (Florida) in Quincy, Florida, United States
 Quincy Municipal Airport (Washington) in Quincy, Washington, United States